The BHP Whyalla Tramway is a  gauge heavy-haul railway,  long, on the Eyre Peninsula in South Australia. Opened in 1901, it was built by, and until 2000 operated by, the Broken Hill Proprietary Company (BHP).  it was owned by Liberty House Group and operated on its behalf by rail operator One Rail Australia, which was sold in 2022 to Aurizon.

History

In 1899, BHP was granted a lease to mine iron ore from the Middleback Ranges.  The Hummock Hill to Iron Knob Tramways and Jetties Act 1900 authorised BHP to build a 54 kilometre line from Hummock Hill, Whyalla to Iron Knob that opened on 28 August 1901.

In 1930, a branch opened from Middleton Junction to Iron Baron. The latter closed in 1947 and reopened in 1958. In 1990 it was extended 32 kilometres from Iron Baron to Iron Duke. After iron ore production ceased at Iron Baron in 1991 and Iron Duke in 1998, the line from Middleton Junction closed. With the reopening of the Iron Baron Mine, in mid-2012 the line reopened to Iron Baron.

In the 1960s, the internal Whyalla Steelworks network was converted to standard gauge to allow large 200 ton capacity torpedo ladles to be used. It also allowed standard gauge trains from interstate to access the steelworks when the Whyalla railway line opened in October 1972.

In 2000, operations were contracted out to Australian Southern Railroad (ASR), with locomotive maintenance taken over by Clyde Engineering and track maintenance by Transfield. In July 2022, the contract was included in the sale of One Rail Australia, as ASR had become, to Aurizon.

Rolling stock
Many of the steam locomotives used on the tramway were transferred from BHP's Broken Hill operations. By 1941, the fleet comprised 12 locomotives.

A petrol-electric locomotive was purchased from the Davenport Locomotive Works, Iowa in 1928 for use at Iron Knob.

DH and DE class diesel locomotives replaced the steam locomotives in the 1950s. With the reopening of the line to Iron Baron, five GWNs were delivered in 2013. In July 2019, five former Queensland Railways 2250 class locomotives were repatriated from South Africa to replace the GWNs.

Notes

References

BHP
Eyre Peninsula
Railway lines in South Australia
Railway lines opened in 1901
1901 establishments in Australia
Mining railways in Australia
Iron ore railways